Malkangiri historically known as 'Malikamardhangiri' is a town and a Municipality in Malkangiri district in the Indian state of Odisha. It is the headquarters of the Malkangiri district.  Malkangiri is the new home of the East Pakistani refugees (present day Bangladesh), who were rehabilitated since 1965 under the Dandakaranya Project. Also some Sri Lankan Tamil refugees were rehabilitated in Malkangiri town, following the armed struggle of LTTE in the early 1990s (most of them have returned, baring a couple of households). Currently it is one of the most naxalite-affected areas of the state and is a part of the Red Corridor.

History 
Malkangiri or Malikamardhangiri as it was historically known was founded by Simhadri Vivek for his queen (1676-1681 CE), ruler of Nandapur-Jeypore kingdom of Odisha. He was a valorous military genius who defeated the joint forces of the French and the army of Golconda and captured fifteen French canons. He killed the general of the Golconda army called Malik Mohammad and therefore was named 'Malik-mardhan' which means 'destroyer of Malik'. He also constructed a strong fort named Malikamardhangadha and it is surmised that the whole area in which the fort was located came to be known in the course of time as Malikamardhangiri and later the British renamed it as Malkangiri.

Geography

Demographics
 India census, Malkangiri had a population of 31,007. Males constitute 52% of the population and females 48%. Malkangiri has an average literacy rate of 57%, lower than the national average of 59.5%: male literacy is 65%, and female literacy is 48%. In Malkangiri, 15% of the population is under 6 years of age.

Politics
After 2019 elections Current MLA from Malkangiri Assembly (ST) Constituency is Shri Aditya Madhi of Bharatiya Janata Party. Previous MLA from Malkangiri Assembly (ST) Constituency is Manas Kumar Madkami of BJD, who won the seat in 2014. Previous MLAs from this seat were Arabinda Dhali of BJP in 2000 and in 1995, Naka Kanaya who won it for JD in 1990 and for JNP in 1977, Nadiabasi Biswas of INC in 1985, Naka Laxmaya of INC(I) in 1980.

Malkangiri is part of Nabarangpur (Lok Sabha constituency).

References

External links

 Official website
 Map of Malkangiri

Cities and towns in Malkangiri district